Coptic TV (CTV) is the official Coptic Orthodox TV station broadcasting in Arabic via satellite to viewers in Egypt. Tharwat Bassily, a business man, was instrumental in establishing the television network, which was started in 2007.

CTV subsequently started broadcasting in North America and elsewhere. Their headquarters are located in Cairo, Egypt.

External links

2007 establishments in Egypt
Coptic Orthodox Church
Christian television networks
Television stations in Egypt
Television channels and stations established in 2007
Mass media in Cairo